The Isaac Newton Group of Telescopes or ING consists of three optical telescopes: the William Herschel Telescope, the Isaac Newton Telescope, and the Jacobus Kapteyn Telescope, operated by a collaboration between the UK Science and Technology Facilities Council, the Dutch NWO and the Spanish IAC. The telescopes are located at Roque de los Muchachos Observatory on La Palma in the Canary Islands.

These telescopes were formerly under the control of the Royal Greenwich Observatory before UK government cutbacks in 1998.

See also
 Isaac Newton

External links
ING Homepage
 Science and Technology Facilities Council (STFC)
 Nederlandse Organisatie voor Wetenschappelijk Onderzoe (NWO)
 Instituto de Astrofísica de Canarias (IAC)

Astronomical observatories in La Palma